Jesionka may refer to the following places:
Jesionka, Gostynin County in Masovian Voivodeship (east-central Poland)
Jesionka, Płońsk County in Masovian Voivodeship (east-central Poland)
Jesionka, Żyrardów County in Masovian Voivodeship (east-central Poland)
Jesionka, Nowy Dwór Mazowiecki County in Masovian Voivodeship (east-central Poland)
Jesionka, Greater Poland Voivodeship (west-central Poland)
Jesionka, Lubusz Voivodeship (west Poland)